The 2011 Imo State gubernatorial election was the 7th gubernatorial election of Imo State, Nigeria. Held on April 26, 2011, the All Progressives Grand Alliance nominee Rochas Okorocha won the election, defeating Ikedi Ohakim of the People's Democratic Party.

Results 
A total of 19 candidates contested in the election. Rochas Okorocha from the All Progressives Grand Alliance won the election, defeating Ikedi Ohakim from the People's Democratic Party. Valid votes was 750,964.

References 

Imo State gubernatorial elections
Imo gubernatorial
April 2011 events in Nigeria